The 1975 Baltimore Orioles season concluded with the ball club finishing  games behind the Boston Red Sox in second place in the American League East with a 90–69 record. The team stayed in playoff contention until a doubleheader sweep by the New York Yankees at Shea Stadium on the penultimate day of the regular season on September 27. Both the Orioles and Red Sox played less than a full 162-game schedule (159 and 160 respectively) primarily due to heavy rainfall across the Eastern United States in the wake of Hurricane Eloise. The regular season would have been extended two days had the divisional title race not been decided by September 28, with the Orioles hosting the Chicago White Sox in a single night game and the Detroit Tigers in a twi-night doubleheader and the Red Sox twice playing the Yankees at Shea simultaneously. Further lack of resolution would have necessitated a one-game playoff at Memorial Stadium on October 1.

Offseason 
 December 3, 1974: Enos Cabell and Rob Andrews were traded by the Orioles to the Houston Astros for Lee May and Jay Schlueter.
 December 4, 1974: Dave McNally, Rich Coggins, and Bill Kirkpatrick (minors) were traded by the Orioles to the Montreal Expos for Mike Torrez and Ken Singleton.
 December 18, 1974: Bryn Smith was signed as an amateur free agent by the Orioles.
 February 25, 1975: Boog Powell and Don Hood were traded by the Orioles to the Cleveland Indians for Dave Duncan and Al McGrew (minors).

Regular season

Season standings

Record vs. opponents

Notable transactions 
 June 3, 1975: 1975 Major League Baseball Draft
Steve Lake was drafted by the Orioles in the 3rd round.
Darryl Cias was drafted by the Orioles in the 6th round.
 June 15, 1975: Jesse Jefferson was traded by the Orioles to the Chicago White Sox for Tony Muser.

Roster

Player stats

Batting

Starters by position 
Note: Pos = Position; G = Games played; AB = At bats; H = Hits; Avg. = Batting average; HR = Home runs; RBI = Runs batted in

Other batters 
Note: G = Games played; AB = At bats; H = Hits; Avg. = Batting average; HR = Home runs; RBI = Runs batted in

Pitching

Starting pitchers 
Note: G = Games pitched; IP = Innings pitched; W = Wins; L = Losses; ERA = Earned run average; SO = Strikeouts

Other pitchers 
Note: G = Games pitched; IP = Innings pitched; W = Wins; L = Losses; ERA = Earned run average; SO = Strikeouts

Relief pitchers 
Note: G = Games pitched; W = Wins; L = Losses; SV = Saves; ERA = Earned run average; SO = Strikeouts

Farm system

References

External links
1975 Baltimore Orioles team page at Baseball Reference
1975 Baltimore Orioles season at baseball-almanac.com

Bibliography

Baltimore Orioles seasons
Baltimore Orioles season
Baltimore Orioles